Svanbergite is a colorless, yellow or reddish mineral with the chemical formula SrAl3(PO4)(SO4)(OH)6. It has rhombohedral crystals.

It was first described for an occurrence in Varmland, Sweden in 1854 and named for Swedish chemist Lars Fredrik Svanberg (1805–1878).

It occurs in high aluminium medium-grade metamorphic rocks; in bauxite deposits  and from sulfate enriched argillic alteration ( high silica and clay) associated with hydrothermal systems often replacing apatite. It occurs with pyrophyllite, kyanite, andalusite, lazulite, augelite, alunite, kaolinite and quartz.

References

Phosphate minerals
Sulfate minerals
Strontium minerals
Trigonal minerals
Minerals in space group 166
Beudantite group